Kevin Dillon (born 1965) is an American actor.

Kevin Dillon may also refer to:

 Kevin Dillon (character), character from  Rodman Philbrick's young adult novel Freak the Mighty and the film based on it, The Mighty
 Kevin Dillon (English footballer) (born 1959), English former footballer and manager
 Kevin Dillon (Australian footballer) (1924–1984), Australian rules footballer for Richmond
 Kevin Dillon (Gaelic footballer) (born 1941), Irish former Gaelic footballer